'Tim Lester may refer to:

 Tim Lester (American football coach) (born 1977), current head football coach at Western Michigan and former quarterback
 Tim Lester (running back) (born 1968), former Rams, Steelers, and Cowboys player